W.B. Mason Stadium is a 2,400-seat multi-purpose stadium in Easton, Massachusetts.  It is the home of the Stonehill Skyhawks field hockey, football, lacrosse, and track & field programs.  The stadium has a FieldTurf surface and a 400-meter eight-lane track.

History

Naming
The stadium's naming rights are held by W.B. Mason, a business products company based in nearby Brockton.  Before the stadium's construction, W.B. Mason CEO Leo Meehan (himself a Stonehill alumnus and trustee) announced that the company would contribute $1.5 million of its $4 million cost.

The playing surface is known as Timothy J. Coughlin Memorial Field, named after Stonehill alumnus (Class of 1980) and football player Tim "Cogs" Coughlin, who was Managing Director of Cantor Fitzgerald and was killed in its World Trade Center headquarters during the September 11 attacks.

Notable events
October 18, 2012 NCAA Division II Game of the Week on CBS Sports Network
Various Northeast-10 Conference field hockey and women's lacrosse tournament games
2009 & 2016 NCAA Division II Field Hockey Championship
2010 & 2014 Northeast-10 Outdoor Track & Field Championships
2022 NCAA Division II Women’s Lacrosse East Regional Tournament

References

American football venues in Massachusetts
Athletics (track and field) venues in Massachusetts
Lacrosse venues in Massachusetts
Multi-purpose stadiums in the United States
Stonehill Skyhawks
2005 establishments in Massachusetts
Sports venues completed in 2005